Eugene Alexander Regan (born 12 June 1952) is an Irish judge who has served as a Judge of the European Court of Justice since October 2015. He previously served as a Senator for the Agricultural Panel from 2007 to 2011.

Early and personal life
He was educated at University College Dublin, University of Brussels and King's Inns. Regan qualified as a barrister in 1985, commenced practice in 1995 and became a Senior Counsel in 2005. He specialises in European law cases, many with a competition, state aid, public procurement or agricultural dimension.

During a career which began as an intern to Commissioner Patrick Hillery in 1973, Regan worked with Alan Dukes in the mid-1970s as an economist for the Irish Farmers' Association in Dublin and Brussels.

Regan served in the cabinet of Peter Sutherland, when the latter was EU Commissioner for Social Affairs and Competition. Following his return to Ireland from Brussels, he spent eight years as general manager of Agra Trading, a Dublin-based company that trades agricultural produce internationally.

An ardent pro-European, he is Chairman of the Lawyers Group and Project Leader of the Justice and Home Affairs Group in the Institute of International and European Affairs (IIEA), and has contributed to many publications on European law matters, both legal and media. He was also a leading advocate and campaigner in the Amsterdam Treaty and Treaty of Nice referendum campaigns.

He lives in Monkstown, County Dublin with his Danish-born wife, Janne and two daughters.

Political career
He was elected for the first time to Dún Laoghaire–Rathdown County Council on 11 June 2004, having spent in excess of €45,000 on his election. On his election to the Seanad, Regan was appointed by Enda Kenny as party Seanad spokesperson on Justice, Equality and Law Reform and was made a member of the Joint Committee on the Constitution and the Joint Committee on Justice, Equality, Defence and Women's Rights.

Regan, along with Seán Barrett and fellow Councillor John Bailey, were selected as Fine Gael candidates to stand at the 2007 general election in the Dún Laoghaire constituency. Only Barrett was elected for Fine Gael. Regan received the support of former Taoiseach Garret FitzGerald who intervened in a general election for the first time since leaving the Dáil in 1992. Support also came from Alan Dukes and Peter Sutherland. Regan served as Cathaoirleach of Dún Laoghaire–Rathdown County Council from 2006–2007. He was elected to the Seanad on the Agricultural Panel on 24 July 2007.

He is known for bringing the issue of the Willie O'Dea affidavit incident to the attention of the Oireachtas which led to O'Dea's resignation as Minister of Defence.

He did not contest the 2011 Seanad election.

References

Living people
Alumni of University College Dublin
European Court of Justice judges
Fine Gael senators
Institute of European Affairs
Irish barristers
Local councillors in Dún Laoghaire–Rathdown
Mayors of places in the Republic of Ireland
Members of the 23rd Seanad
Irish judges of international courts and tribunals
1952 births
Alumni of King's Inns